Mindaugas Žukauskas (born 24 August 1975 in Šiauliai, Lithuanian SSR, USSR) is a retired Lithuanian professional basketball player, a former captain of the Lithuanian national basketball team. He is a small forward 2.01 m tall. Žukauskas is currently a manager for BC Šiauliai.

Career statistics

Euroleague

|-
| style="text-align:left;"| 2000–01
| style="text-align:left;"| Union Olimpija
| 15 || 7 || 20.1 || .464 || .500 || .667 || 2.2 || .9 || .8 || .1 || 7.5 || 6.2
|-
| style="text-align:left;"| 2002–03
| style="text-align:left;"| Montepaschi Siena
| 22 || 19 || 23.4 || .500 || .519 || .955 || 1.7 || 1.2 || 1.0 || .2 || 6.5 || 4.9
|-
| style="text-align:left;"| 2003–04
| style="text-align:left;"| Montepaschi Siena
| 22 || 10 || 20.1 || .457 || .417 || .846 || 1.8 || 1.4 || 1.0 || .0 || 5.2 || 4.5
|-
| style="text-align:left;"| 2004–05
| style="text-align:left;"| Montepaschi Siena
| 20 || 12 || 17.3 || .543 || .472 || .722 || 2.3 || 1.3 || 1.1 || .1 || 5.1 || 5.1
|-
| style="text-align:left;"| 2005–06
| style="text-align:left;"| Montepaschi Siena
| 13 || 3 || 16.0 || .692 || .360 || .882 || 2.7 || 1.0 || 1.2 || .0 || 4.6 || 6.8

Awards and achievements
Olympic Bronze medalist - 1996
LKL champion - 1998, 1999
European Cup Winner - 1998
NEBL champion - 1999
Euroleague champion - 1999
Slovenian champion - 2001
European champion - 2003
Euroleague 3rd place -  2003, 2004
Italian Serie A champion - 2004

His former teams include Lithuanian Žalgiris Kaunas, Italian Montepaschi Siena and Scavolini Pesaro, and Slovenian KK Union Olimpija.

References
Profile

1975 births
Living people
Basketball players at the 1996 Summer Olympics
Basketball players at the 2004 Summer Olympics
BC Žalgiris players
FIBA EuroBasket-winning players
KK Olimpija players
Lithuanian expatriate basketball people in Italy
Lithuanian men's basketball players
Mens Sana Basket players
Olympic basketball players of Lithuania
Olympic bronze medalists for Lithuania
Olympic medalists in basketball
Sportspeople from Šiauliai
Small forwards
Victoria Libertas Pallacanestro players
Medalists at the 1996 Summer Olympics
2006 FIBA World Championship players
1998 FIBA World Championship players
Lithuanian expatriate basketball people in Slovenia